is a former Japanese football player.

Club statistics

References

External links

1981 births
Living people
Association football people from Saitama Prefecture
Japanese footballers
J2 League players
Japan Football League players
Ehime FC players
Association football defenders